A by-election was held for the South Australian House of Assembly seat of Kavel on 9 May 1992. This was triggered by the resignation of former state Liberal Deputy Premier Eric Roger Goldsworthy. The seat had been retained by the Liberals since it was created and first contested at the 1970 state election. The by-election was held on the same day as the Alexandra by-election.

Results
Call to Australia, who contested the previous election and gained 5.1 percent, did not contest the by-election. The Liberals retained the seat.

See also
List of South Australian state by-elections

References

South Australian state by-elections
1992 elections in Australia
1990s in South Australia